Grace Yia-Hei Kao (born 1974) is an Asian American professor of ethics, who specializes in animal and human rights, ecofeminism, and Asian American Christianity.  Kao earned her Bachelor of Arts and Masters of Arts degrees from Stanford University, and her PhD. at Harvard University.  She is Professor of Ethics at Claremont School of Theology, and was the first Asian American woman to receive tenure there.  She has been appointed as the interim Bishop Roy I. Sano and Kathleen A. Thomas-Sano Endowed Chair in Pacific and Asian Theology.  Kao is also the co-director of the Center for Sexuality, Gender, and Religion (CSGR).

Kao is the author of Grounding Human Rights in a Pluralist World, published in 2011, and co-editor, with Ilsup Ahn, of Asian American Christian Ethics: Voices, Methods, Issues, published in 2015. She received the faculty teaching award at Claremont School of Theology in 2011 and 2017.

Works 

 Kao, Grace Y.  Grounding Human Rights in a Pluralist World. Georgetown University Press, 2011. 
 Kao, Gracy Y. and Ilsup Ahn, eds. Asian American Christian Ethics. Baylor University Press, 2015. 
Kao, Gracy Y. and Rebecca Todd Peters, eds. Encountering the Sacred: Feminist Reflections on Women's Lives. T&T Clark, 2018.

References 

Living people
1974 births
American ethicists
Claremont Graduate University faculty
Harvard University alumni
Stanford University alumni
American women academics
21st-century American women